The women's 4 × 100 metres relay competition at the 2018 Asian Games took place on 29 and 30 August 2018 at the Gelora Bung Karno Stadium in Jakarta, Indonesia.

Schedule
All times are Western Indonesia Time (UTC+07:00)

Records

Results

Round 1
 Qualification: First 3 in each heat (Q) and the next 2 fastest (q) advance to the final.

Heat 1

Heat 2

Final

References

External links
Results

Women's 4 x 100 metres relay
2018 100 women